East High Street Historic District may refer to:
East High Street Historic District (Mount Vernon, Ohio), a National Register of Historic Places listing in Knox County, Ohio
East High Street Historic District (Springfield, Ohio)